The Ringos Mill Covered Bridge spans Fox Creek in Fleming County, Kentucky in a single 90-foot span. It was named for a grist mill situated 50 yards downstream.

The bridge's timbers are of yellow pine. It was probably built by the same contractor who constructed Hillsboro Covered Bridge several miles down Fox Creek.  Abutments are of red stone covered with a concrete facing and the walls are double-sided with yellow poplar. Ventilation and light are provided by clerestory openings in the siding. The bridge is a good example of Theodore Burr's 1814 patented truss design that employs multiple kingposts. Patent bridges were the "bread and butter" of early engineers who typically received one dollar per linear foot of bridge construction for use of the patented design.

See also 
 Goddard Covered Bridge: crosses the Sand Lick Creek in Fleming County, Kentucky
 Hillsboro Covered Bridge: also crosses the Fox Creek in Fleming County, Kentucky

References

Covered bridges on the National Register of Historic Places in Kentucky
Wooden bridges in Kentucky
Tourist attractions in Fleming County, Kentucky
National Register of Historic Places in Fleming County, Kentucky
Road bridges on the National Register of Historic Places in Kentucky
Burr Truss bridges in the United States
Transportation in Fleming County, Kentucky